Adam Duffin (1841–1924) was a unionist politician in Northern Ireland.

Duffin studied at the Royal School, Armagh, and Queen's College.  Despite having no political experience, he was elected as an Ulster Unionist Party member of the Senate of Northern Ireland, aged about 80, in 1921.  He served until his death two years and nine months later. His daughter, Emma, was a wartime nurse whose diaries are now held with the larger Duffin collection in the Public Record Office of Northern Ireland.

References

External links
 

1841 births
1921 deaths
Members of the Senate of Northern Ireland 1921–1925
People educated at The Royal School, Armagh
Ulster Unionist Party members of the Senate of Northern Ireland